Wendy Z. Goldman is an American historian, currently the Paul Mellon Distinguished Professor at Carnegie Mellon University. Her current works involve the history of Joseph Stalin.

She is currently married to pirate historian Marcus Rediker.

Selected publications
Women, the state, and revolution : Soviet family policy and social life, 1917-1936 (1993)
Women at the gates : gender and industry in Stalin's Russia (2002)
Terror and democracy in the age of Stalin : the social dynamics of repression (2007)
Inventing the enemy : denunciation and terror in Stalin's Russia (2011)
Hunger and war : food provisioning in the Soviet Union during World War II (2015)

References

Year of birth missing (living people)
Living people
Carnegie Mellon University faculty
21st-century American historians